The discography of Lenka Kripac, best known as simply Lenka, a singer-songwriter from New South Wales, Australia, consists of five studio albums and eleven  singles.  This list does not include material released by Decoder Ring, a band in which Lenka was a member before pursuing a solo career.

Lenka released her debut self-titled album in 2008.  The album's lead single, and Kripac's debut single, was titled "The Show" and remains her most successful single to date.  Her second album, Two, was released over two years later in 2011, but failed to gain the same commercial success as the singer's debut album, due to a string of unsuccessful singles.  In November 2012, "Everything at Once" was released as Two'''s third and final single after being sampled in a Windows 8 advertisement, and became Lenka's second most successful single to date.  Her third studio album, Shadows, was released in June 2013.  On 10 March 2015, she released the single "Blue Skies" from her new album, The Bright Side, released on 29 May in Germany. On 13 October 2017 , she released her fifth album, Attune''.

Studio albums

Singles

Guest appearances

References 

Pop music discographies
Discographies of Australian artists